Oman–Turkey relations are the foreign relations between Oman and Turkey. Turkey's historic relationship with Oman has wavered between friendly indifference and courtship, but mutual differences were set aside in 2002 when the new Turkish government embraced a policy of engagement with Oman.

Turkey formally recognized Oman in 1970, which declared its independence the same year and diplomatic relations between the two countries were established in 1973. The two countries collaborated in their support for the 1979 Camp David accords and were among the four majority-Muslim states that did not break relations with Egypt after the signing of the Egyptian-Israeli Peace Treaty in 1979. 

Following the elimination of Iraq as a counterweight to Iran after the 2003 invasion of Iraq, the Gulf Cooperation Council (GCC), which includes Oman, has fostered stronger ties with Turkey in an attempt to enhance GCC security.

Recently, both countries have been the targets of hostile UAE spying:

 In December 2010, Oman discovered a spy network operated by the United Arab Emirates which collected information on Oman's military and government. They were reportedly interested in who would replace Qaboos as his heir and about Oman's relations with Iran.

 In 2019, it was reported that Project Raven, a UAE clandestine surveillance and hacking operation targeting other governments, militants, and human rights activists critical of the UAE monarchy, specifically targeted Oman and Turkey, succeeded in hacking a device belonging to Yusuf bin Alawi, the Omani Minister of Foreign Affairs.

Historical background 

Oman was controlled by the Seljuk Empire 1000-1054 and after a period of Portuguese colonization, Oman became part of the Ottoman Empire following the recapture of Muscat in 1552 until 1698.

Official visits

Economic relations 

Trade volume between the two countries was 489 million USD in 2018 (Turkish exports/imports: 422/67 million USD).

Cultural relations 

Turkish television drama have become massively popular across in Oman, as millions of Arabs stop everything daily to view the latest episode of shows such as Hareem Al Sultan and Fatima, going a long way to promote a positive image of Turkey in Oman.

See also 

 Foreign relations of Oman
 Foreign relations of Turkey

References 

Oman–Turkey relations
Turkey
Bilateral relations of Turkey